Scincella melanosticta, also known as black ground skink or black-spotted smooth skink, is a species of skink in the genus of Scincella. It is found in Myanmar, Thailand, Vietnam, Cambodia, and possibly also in Laos.

References

External links

Scincella
Reptiles of Myanmar
Reptiles of Cambodia
Reptiles of Thailand
Reptiles of Vietnam
Reptiles described in 1887
Taxa named by George Albert Boulenger